Bellhouse is a locative surname that derives from Middle English bel-hous, Old English bell-hūs, or the place name Bell House. Notable people with the surname include:

 Brian Bellhouse (1937–2017), British academic, engineer, and entrepreneur
 David Bellhouse (1764–1840), English Victorian builder
 Ernest Bellhouse (1871–1920), English footballer
 Michael Bellhouse (born 1976), English cricketer
 Molly Blackburn, née Bellhouse (1930–1985), South African anti-Apartheid campaigner
 Richard Bellhouse (1825–1906), English cricketer, watercolourist, and architect
 Thomas Bellhouse (1818–1886), English cricketer

See also
 Bell House (disambiguation)

References 

Surnames of English origin